There are 13 active business routes of Interstate 70 in Colorado. Four other business routes also used to exist within the state.

Grand Junction–Clifton business loop 

Interstate 70 Business (I-70 Bus.) is a business loop that runs through Grand Junction and Clifton.  This route is mostly an expressway, with the exception of downtown Grand Junction, where the route is divided into two one-way streets (Pitkin and Ute avenues) and then turns north onto a four-lane surface street (1st Street). The route is partially signed with U.S. Highway 6 (US 6) and US 50 (separate and together). The route is one of the most important routes in the Grand Junction area.

Major intersections

Palisade business loop 

Interstate 70 Business (I-70 Bus.) served Palisade from I-70. It started at exit 42 from the Interstate as Elberta Avenue. It then turned east onto 8th Avenue and continued east as G road, which was once US 6. The route looped around the Colorado River east of town and terminated at I-70 at exit 44. The route is retired.

Major intersections

Rifle business loop 

Interstate 70 Business (I-70 Bus.) was a  route that served Rifle and overlapped US 6 from exit 87 on I-70 to State Highway 13 (SH 13, Railroad Avenue). It turned south and crossed the Colorado River before terminating at exit 90. It was unsigned and later decommissioned in 2004.

Major intersections

Silt business spur 

Interstate 70 Business (I-70 Bus.) serves Silt and runs from I-70 to US 6. The road begins on the south side of I-70. The intersection between I-70 Bus. and I-70 forms a diamond interchange. The   route is currently unsigned and runs along 9th Street before terminating at a roundabout at US 6.

Major intersections

Eagle business spur 

Interstate 70 Business (I-70 Bus.) serves Eagle and runs from US 6 to I-70. The road begins with a roundabout at the intersection of I-70 Bus. and US 6. On the other side of the roundabout, the road continues as Church Street. Along I-70 Bus., the road is known as Eby Creek Road. The route then heads northward over the Colorado River in the northern city limits of Eagle, intersecting Chambers Avenue and Loren Road before meeting its northern terminus with I-70. The intersection forms a dumbbell interchange, and Eby Creek Road continues north. The route is currently unsigned.

Major intersections

Edwards business spur 

Interstate 70 Business (I-70 Bus.) is a spur serving Edwards that runs from I-70 to US 6. The road runs south from exit 163 on I-70 with roundabouts on both sides of the interchange followed by a third roundabout at Miller Ranch Road. I-70 Bus. makes a slight southwest turn as it runs along a bridge over a railroad line, then turns back to the south before crossing another bridge over the Eagle River. I-70 Bus. ends at US 6, and Edwards Access Road becomes Edwards Village Road as it curves to the west. The route is unsigned.

Major intersections

Avon business spur 

Interstate 70 Business (I-70 Bus.) served Avon from I-70. It started at the dogbone interchange at exit 167 from the Interstate and went south along Avon Road. It passed through two raindrop roundabouts at the interchange and two more  roundabouts through town. The route terminated at another roundabout at US 6. It was decommissioned in 1999.

Major intersections

Frisco business loop 

Interstate 70 Business (I-70 Bus.) served Frisco from I-70. It was signed along Main Street from the exit 201 diamond interchange and passed through downtown. It turned to the north on SH 9, known locally as Summit Boulevard, and terminated at a roundabout at the diamond interchange at exit 203 on I-70. The route is retired.

Major intersections

Idaho Springs business loop 

Interstate 70 Business (I-70 Bus.) is a loop serving Idaho Springs from I-70. The route starts at a partial Y interchange at exit 239. The route parallels I-70 to the north through downtown along Colorado Boulevard. It passes through a roundabout and up and over the Interstate on an overpass before terminating at exit 241. The east end of I-70 Bus. was rebuilt in 2015 from a tight parclo interchange.

Major intersections

Denver metropolitan area business loop 

Interstate 70 Business (I-70 Bus.) is a  route between West Pleasant View and Aurora, as well as traveling through Downtown Denver, all within the Denver metropolitan area. Known locally as Colfax Avenue, the route connects with I-70 at both ends. This route is one of the longest business routes in the country. It starts at a partial Y interchange at exit 288 on I-70 east of Aurora. It is concurrent with US 40 the entire way and is also concurrent with US 287 from I-70 east of Aurora to the partial cloverleaf interchange at Federal Boulevard in Denver, where US 287 goes north. It interchanges with I-225 and I-25 in the metro area. The route ends at exit 262 on I-70 at a diamond interchange in West Pleasant View while US 40/Colfax Avenue continues toward the mountains.

Major intersections

Watkins business spur 

Interstate 70 Business (I-70 Bus.) serves Watkins and runs from I-70 to SH 36. It starts at a diamond interchange at exit 295 at I-70 as Watkins Road as it enters town. The route terminates at SH 36 (Colfax Avenue). The route is only signed at exit 295 along I-70 and is referred to as a business loop instead of a spur.

Major intersections

Strasburg business spur 

Interstate 70 Business (I-70 Bus.) serves Strasburg and runs from I-70 to SH 36. The route starts at I-70 at exit 310 at a diamond interchange as Arrowhead Street. It becomes Wagner Street at the overpass entering Strasburg. The route terminates at SH 36 (15th avenue) and is unsigned.

Major intersections

Deer Trail business spur 

Interstate 70 Business (I-70 Bus.) serves Deer Trail and runs from US 40 to I-70. It starts at a diamond interchange at I-70 at exit 328 and runs along Cedar Street through downtown before terminating at SH 40 (1st Avenue). The route is unsigned.

Major intersections

Agate business spur 

Interstate 70 Business (I-70 Bus.) serves Agate and runs from US 40 to I-70. It starts at a diamond interchange at exit 340 and County Road 166 and runs as an unnamed road entering Agate. The route becomes Main Street as it intersects 2nd Avenue. It terminates at the intersection of 1st Avenue and Main Street. The route is unsigned.

Major intersections

Limon business loop 

 
Interstate 70 Business (I-70 Bus.) serves Limon and has both its terminuses at a concurrency of I-70, US 24, US 40, and US 287. It starts at exit 359 west of Limon at a diamond interchange and heads south along with US 24, US 40, and US 287. It makes a left turn at the first traffic signal and enters town as Main Street. The route passes under the Interstate at a diamond interchange at exit 361 then loops around and ends at another diamond interchange at exit 363 on I-70. US 24 becomes concurrent with I-70 and US 40/US 287 remain concurrent with each other as they continue southeast.

Major intersections

Vona business spur 

Interstate 70 Business (I-70 Bus.) serves Vona and runs from US 24 to I-70. It starts at a diamond interchange at exit 412 on I-70 and goes north as County Road 23 (1st Avenue). The route ends at US 24 (North Street) before entering Vona. The route is unsigned.

Major intersections

Burlington business loop 

Interstate 70 Business (I-70 Bus.) serves Burlington and has both its terminuses at I-70. It starts at a diamond interchange east of Burlington as Rose Avenue. It is concurrent with US 24. The route becomes concurrent with US 385 along with US 24 after it intersects 8th Street. After passing through downtown, it makes a left turn at Lincoln Street, remaining concurrent with US 385 until it meets I-70 again at another diamond interchange where it terminates. The route appears to be unsigned but it is signed along the Interstate.

Major intersections

See also

References

External links

Business Colorado
70 Business
70 Business